Florodelphax is a genus of planthopper belonging to the family Delphacidae.

The genus was first described by Juhan Vilbaste in 1968.

The species of this genus are found in Europe.

Species:
 Florodelphax leptosoma
 Florodelphax paryphasma (Flor, 1861)

References

Delphacinae